Olaf Erling Kortner (10 May 1920 –  26 January 1998) was a Norwegian politician for the Liberal Party.

He was born in Skien.

From 1948 to 1950 he was the leader of the Young Liberals of Norway, the youth wing of the Liberal Party.

He was a member of Strinda municipality council in the period 1951–1955. From August to September 1963 he served as the Minister of Education and Church Affairs during the short-lived centre-right cabinet of John Lyng.

He served in the position of deputy representative to the Norwegian Parliament from Oslo during the terms 1965–1969 and 1969–1973. During parts of these terms, from 1965 to 1970, he met as a regular representative for Helge Seip while he was appointed to the cabinet Borten.

A cand.philol. by education (1948), he worked as a teacher in Strinda and Oslo from 1950 to 1970. From 1971 to 1990 he headed the school administration in Akershus.

References

1920 births
1998 deaths
Liberal Party (Norway) politicians
Members of the Storting
Government ministers of Norway
20th-century Norwegian politicians
Politicians from Skien
Ministers of Education of Norway